Whiskeytown was an American alternative country band formed in 1994 from Raleigh, North Carolina. Fronted by Ryan Adams, the group included members Caitlin Cary, Phil Wandscher, Eric "Skillet" Gilmore, and Mike Daly. They disbanded in 2000 with Adams leaving to pursue his solo career. Whiskeytown gradually expanded its sound outside the confines of alternative country while still maintaining its alternative roots.

The band released three albums. No two albums shared a consistent lineup; Adams and Cary remained the only constants.

History
After performing punk rock with a band called The Patty Duke Syndrome, Adams founded Whiskeytown in 1994 in Raleigh, North Carolina. The music of country-rock artist Gram Parsons served as his inspiration. The band initially consisted of Adams, violinist Caitlin Cary, drummer Eric "Skillet" Gilmore, bassist Steve Grothmann and guitarist Phil Wandscher.

Faithless Street era (1995–1996)
Faithless Street, released on Mood Food Records in 1995, established the band as one of the genre's leaders, thanks to glowing reviews in publications such as No Depression, and helped the band score a major-label record deal with the Geffen Records imprint Outpost.

Faithless was re-released on the imprint in 1998 with nearly a dozen bonus tracks from the era. Among the bonus tracks were previously unreleased tracks and tracks that had been released on earlier albums and EPs, including Strangers Almanac and Rural Free Delivery. One track, "Oklahoma," was removed. Adams claimed that the reason for the re-release was the muddy sound of the original version and his distaste for "Oklahoma," which was added to the album despite his objections.

Strangers Almanac era (1997–1998)
Whiskeytown's 1997 major-label debut, Strangers Almanac, helped to establish Adams' reputation as a songwriter. In the midst of the album's recording, Gilmore and Grothman left, and Wandscher left soon after the album's release. The band cycled through numerous members throughout the next year, including Jeff Rice and Steven Terry, both of whom were involved in the recording of Almanac but left later that year.

The band's reputation preceded it in the live setting. In a 1997 Detroit Free Press article titled Whiskeytown: half band, half soap opera, a June 1997 show at Mac's Bar in Lansing, Michigan was described by fans as a half-baked performance.

Despite the band's internal strife, Almanac was a successful album with critics, with the tracks "16 Days" and the Replacements-esque "Yesterday's News" receiving significant radio play. The positive reviews came from increasingly mainstream publications such as Rolling Stone, who claimed at the time, "If there's to be a Nirvana among the bands that are imprecisely dubbed alternative country, look to Whiskeytown."  In January 1998, the band taped a live performance for Austin City Limits.

During the tour for Stranger's Almanac, most of the band was fired or quit at a concert in Kansas City. The only people who started and finished the tour were Adams, Caitlin Cary, Mike Daly and tour manager Thomas O'Keefe.

Pneumonia and the band's demise (1999–2001)
The band managed to add a new core member in multi-instrumentalist Mike Daly, who contributed significantly to the band's sound on their third album, Pneumonia.

The album's recording was a much different affair from the first two—likely because of the band's constantly changing dynamic. The traditional country of the first two albums, especially Faithless, was largely replaced with a more sophisticated country-rooted pop sound, very similar to Wilco's 1999 album Summerteeth. Also adding to the different flavor of the album was a cast of guest stars, including The Replacements' Tommy Stinson and The Smashing Pumpkins' James Iha.

Despite the album's completion and Whiskeytown's sizable fanbase, Outpost Records closed during the merger between Polygram and Universal, and as a result the album stayed in limbo for nearly two years, effectively ending the band.

Lost Highway Records, the roots-minded label imprint of Universal Music, picked up the album after signing Adams (who, in the interim, recorded his highly acclaimed debut solo record Heartbreaker on indie label Bloodshot Records) and released it in May 2001 [].

Post-Whiskeytown and talk of reunion
Since the band dissolved, most core members have chosen to remain active in music. Cary, who married original drummer Eric "Skillet" Gilmore, has released three solo albums and created a female folk trio named Tres Chicas. In 2010 she formed a duo group called The Small Ponds with Matt Douglas of Raleigh band The Proclivities. In 2013, Cary and solo artist Jon Lindsay co-founded the NC Music Love Army – a collective of many notable musicians from North Carolina who oppose the leadership of the newly emerged Republican supermajority in their home state. Between 2013 and 2014, the group has put out nine releases on their own label (Love Army Records), as well as thru Redeye Distribution and Bloodshot Records.

Adams has remained in the spotlight since the band's breakup, releasing numerous solo albums, including three in 2005. In 2004, Adams founded Ryan Adams and The Cardinals, an alternative rock band. The band released several albums before disbanding in 2009. He has drawn considerable praise from such legends as Elton John and Phil Lesh for his songwriting.  In February 2001, original Whiskeytown guitarist Phil Wandscher joined Adams at a Seattle show to perform two songs.  It was the first time the two had appeared onstage together in 3½ years.

Adams and Cary have claimed to be reuniting Whiskeytown on multiple occasions, as recently as 2010, but nothing new has been released yet. He told an interviewer in January 2017 that he was writing a book about the band, but had no plans to record or tour with Whiskeytown. A scheduling conflict was blamed as the reason for the reunion not taking place. The band did reunite for a one-off, impromptu gig after one of Adams' shows in Raleigh, NC, in 2005. Gilmore, Cary, and Adams were joined on-stage by Adams' pedal steel player, Jon Graboff, and bassist Catherine Popper.

Members

Founding members
Ryan Adams – vocals, rhythm guitar
Caitlin Cary – fiddle, vocals, percussion
Eric "Skillet" Gilmore – drums, percussion
Steve Grothmann – bass guitar
Phil Wandscher – lead guitar, vocals

Later members
Ed Crawford – guitar
Ron Bartholomew – bass guitar
Steven Terry – drums, percussion
Brad Rice – electric guitar
Mike Daly – bass guitar, keyboards, guitar, mandolin, vocals
Jeff Rice – bass guitar
Jenni Snyder – bass guitar
Chris Laney – bass guitar
Bill Ladd – pedal steel guitar – studio session musician, appeared on Theme for a Trucker, Wim Wenders' movie The End of Violence
Mike Santoro – bass – Former member of "The Selves," a band from Northern New Jersey
Chris Riser – lap steel guitar, pedal steel guitar – 1994–95, also a member of Chapel Hill's Pine State
Nicholas Petti – pedal steel guitar – 1995–96, also a member of Chapel Hill's Pine State
Jon Wurster – drums
James Iha – guitar

Discography

Albums
Studio albums
1995: Faithless Street
1997: Strangers Almanac
2001: Pneumonia

Unreleased
1996: Those Weren't the Days
1996: The Freightwhaler Sessions
1997: Forever Valentine

EPs
1995: Angels
1997: Theme for a Trucker
1997: Rural Free Delivery
1997: In Your Wildest Dreams

Singles
1997: "16 Days"
1998: "Yesterday's News"
1998: Car Songs (split 7-inch w/ Neko Case & The Sadies)
2001: "Don't Be Sad"
2009: "San Antone" / "The Great Divide"

Compilations
1996: "Blank Generation" from Who the Hell? A Tribute to Richard Hell
1996: Smash Hits Opry
1996: "The Great Divide" from Power of Tower: Live from the WXDU Lounge
1997: "Bottom of the Glass" from Straight Outta Boone County
1997: "Theme for a Trucker" from The End of Violence Soundtrack
1997: "Busted" from Revival Vol. 2: Kudzu & Hollerin' Contest
1998: "Wither, I'm a Flower" from Hope Floats: Music from the Motion Picture
1998: "Me and My Ticket" from The Garden Place: Songs By Our Friends
1998: "I Hope It Rains at My Funeral" from Real: The Tom T. Hall Project
1999: "Nervous Breakdown" from Alt.Country Exposed Roots
1999: "A Song for You" from Return of the Grievous Angel: A Tribute to Gram Parsons
1999: "Silver Wings" from Poor Little Knitter On the Road
2003: "Choked Up" from Lost Highway: Lost & Found Vol. 1
2004: "Faithless Street" from No Depression: What It Sounds Like Vol. 1
2006: "Give Me Another Chance" from Big Star, Small World

References

External links

Extensive Whiskeytown discography
Lost Highway Whiskeytown artist page – Includes 1-minute song samples from Pneumonia
Whiskeytown at Rolling Stone

 
Musical groups disestablished in 1999
Musical groups established in 1994
Musical groups from Raleigh, North Carolina
Lost Highway Records artists
Ryan Adams
1994 establishments in North Carolina
Bloodshot Records artists